Raúl Meráz Torres (born January 14, 1992, in Apatzingán, Michoacán) is a Mexican professional footballer who last played for Halcones de Morelos.

References

External links
 

Living people
1992 births
Association football forwards
C.F. Pachuca players
Tecos F.C. footballers
Alebrijes de Oaxaca players
Tampico Madero F.C. footballers
Tlaxcala F.C. players
Liga MX players
Ascenso MX players
Liga Premier de México players
Tercera División de México players
Footballers from Michoacán
Mexican footballers
People from Apatzingán